Patta may refer to:

 Debora Patta (born 1964), South African journalist
 Henry Patta (born 1987), Ecuadorian footballer
 Patta Sisodia, commander of Chittor in the Siege of Chittorgarh
 Pata (sword) (also spelled "patta"), an Indian sword
 Patta (land deed), a land deed in South Asia

See also
 Pata (disambiguation)
 Patta Fort, a ruined fort in Maharashtra, India